The Cabinet of Nauru is the executive branch of the government of the Republic of Nauru, a small island nation in the Pacific Ocean. Article 17 (1.) of the Constitution of Nauru provides for the "executive authority of Nauru" to be vested in "a Cabinet constituted as provided by this Part" with the "general direction and control of the government of Nauru", specified in Article 17 (2.) as being "collectively responsible" to the Parliament of Nauru. The Cabinet is directly appointed by the President of Nauru, and comprises the president, who presides over meetings over the Cabinet, and either four or five members of the parliament. The president is also responsible for assigning Members of the Cabinet, including himself, "responsibility for any business of the government of Nauru", as ministers. Members of the Cabinet are required to swear or affirm an oath of office prior to being appointed.

Cabinet portfolios
 Chairman of the Cabinet (as President of Nauru)
 Minister Assisting the President of Nauru
 Minister of Finance
 Minister of Foreign Affairs
 Minister of Justice
 Responsibility for Nauru Phosphate Royalties Trust

Former cabinet 2013-2019
The following cabinet was appointed by Baron Waqa on June 13, 2013 after he was elected President of Nauru. Following the July 2016 general election, the Cabinet remained exactly the same.

References

Cabinet
Nauru